George Phillips Manners (1789 – 28 November 1866) was a British architect, who was Bath City Architect from 1823 to 1862.

In his early career he worked with Charles Harcourt Masters, and after about 1845 was in partnership with J. E. Gill.  He retired in 1862.

Architectural practice
The architectural practice bore the following names (compiled by Michael Forsyth in Pevsner Architectural Guide: Bath, 2003):

George Phillips Manners: 1820–1845
Manners & Gill: 1845–1866 (with John Elkington Gill)
John Elkington Gill: 1866–1874
Gill & Browne: 1874–1879 (with Thomas Browne)
Browne & Gill: 1879–1899 (with Wallace Gill)
Gill & Morris: 1899–1903
Wallace Gill: 1903–1909
Mowbray A. Green: 1909–1914
Mowbray A. Green & Hollier: 1914–1947
Frank W. Beresford-Smith: from 1947 (later acquired by Beresford-Smith’s son)

From 1846 to 1909, the practice had its offices at No. 1 Fountain Building.

Works
His works include a number of churches, initially in Perpendicular or Norman style, latterly in Gothic.

Churches in and around Bath:

 Bath Abbey, restoration (his additions were later removed by Sir Gilbert Scott)
 St Michael's Church, Broad Street (1836)
 St Michael's Church, Twerton (1839)
 Catholic Apostolic Church, now Guinea Lane Nursery (1840)
 Bath Abbey Cemetery Mortuary Chapel, Widcombe (1844)
 St Matthew's, Widcombe (1846–1847)
Churches elsewhere:

 Holy Trinity Church, Godney, Somerset (1838)
 Christ Church, Bradford-on-Avon, Wiltshire (1839) (again, his work was remodelled to lose its integrity by Sir G. G. Scott)
 Church Of Holy Trinity, Cleeve, Somerset (1840)
 Holy Trinity Church, Clandown, Somerset (1846–1847)
 St Paul's Church, Tiverton, Devon (1854–1856)

Other designs include:
 Obelisk (Victoria Column) to commemorate the coming-of-age of Princess Victoria, Royal Victoria Park, Bath (1837)
 Bath City Gaol (1843) in East Twerton (often referred to as Twerton Gaol)
 Rectory, Kingston Deverill, Wiltshire, remodelling (1858)
 Bluecoat School, Bath (1859–1860) (now in residential use)

References

Further reading

 H.M. Colvin, A Biographical Dictionary of British Architects, 1600–1840 (1997) 
 Michael Forsyth, Bath, Pevsner Architectural Guides (2003) 

1789 births
1866 deaths
19th-century English architects
Architects from Bath, Somerset
English ecclesiastical architects
Gothic Revival architects